The Extraliga may refer to any of the top-division ice hockey leagues in former Czechoslovakia:

 Czechoslovak First Ice Hockey League, which in 1993 was divided to:
 Czech Extraliga
 Slovak Extraliga
 Belarusian Extraliga

It may also refer to:
Baseball Extraliga the top baseball league in Czech Republic.
KB Extraliga, the top rugby union competition in Czech Republic.
Extra-Liga, the top futsal league in Ukraine.
Slovak Futsal Extraliga, Slovakian futsal league.